The Coverups is an American cover band that serves as a side project for Green Day members Billie Joe Armstrong and Mike Dirnt.  Founded in January 2018 as an outlet for performing cover songs, the band consists of guitarists Armstrong and Dirnt as well as several musicians from the Green Day circle, such as touring guitarist Jason White, audio engineer Chris Dugan on drums and tour manager Bill Schneider on bass.  White, Armstrong, and Dirnt all share lead vocal duties.

The band performed their first shows at the Ivy Room in Albany, California on January 15 and January 29, 2018. Although the band has not formally toured or recorded, they sporadically perform one-off shows, usually in small clubs.  Some shows are unannounced, such as their third show, a performance in San Francisco on March 8, 2018.

Band members
 Billie Joe Armstrong – lead vocals, guitar 
 Mike Dirnt – vocals, guitar 
 Jason White – vocals, guitar 
 Bill Schneider – vocals, bass 
 Chris Dugan – drums

See also
Me First and the Gimme Gimmes
Foxboro Hot Tubs

References

Green Day
Cover bands
Rock music supergroups
Musical groups established in 2018
2018 establishments in California